Faleomavaega Vincent Fepulea'i (born date unknown) is a Samoan former rugby union player. He played as a scrum-half. Currently, as of 2015 he is Samoa Rugby Union CEO.

Career
His first cap for the Manu Samoa was against Wales, at Cardiff, on November 12, 1988 and his last international cap was against Romania, at Bucharest, on October 14, 1989.

Notes

External links

Date of birth missing (living people)
Living people
Samoan rugby union players
Rugby union scrum-halves
Samoa international rugby union players
Year of birth missing (living people)